The Armadillo Tea Rooms was a café in Liverpool that were a significant part of the early '80s music scene. This was helped by their proximity to Mathew Street and Probe Records.

They were especially noted for the furry seat covers on the toilets.

The building is now occupied by Flanagan's Apple.

References 

Scouse culture of the early 1980s
Buildings and structures in Liverpool
Coffeehouses and cafés in the United Kingdom